Saint Mary's College (in French, Collège Sainte-Marie), is the name of several colleges and schools:

Australia
St Mary's College, Ipswich, an all-girls Catholic school in Queensland
St Mary's College, Maryborough, a co-educational school in Queensland
St Mary's College, Toowoomba, an all-boys Christian Brothers school in Toowoomba, Queensland
St Mary's College, Adelaide, an all-girls Catholic school in South Australia
St Mary's College, Hobart, an all-girls Catholic school in Tasmania
St Mary's College (Seymour), a school in Victoria
St Mary's College, Melbourne (residential college), a residential college affiliated with the University of Melbourne in Victoria
St Mary's College, Melbourne (school), a co-educational school in Victoria

Canada
St. Mary's University College, Calgary, Alberta
St. Mary's College, Sault Ste. Marie, Ontario
the former St. Mary's College, Brockville, Ontario
the former Collège Sainte-Marie de Montréal, Quebec

India
St. Mary's College, Manarcaud, Kerala
St. Mary's College, Thrissur, Kerala
St. Mary's College, Hyderabad, Telangana

Ireland
St Mary's College, Dublin
St Mary's College, Galway
St Mary's College, Dundalk

Jamaica
St. Mary's College, Jamaica, a co-educational school in Saint Catherine Parish, Jamaica

Japan
St. Mary's College (Japan)

Mauritius
Saint Mary's College, Mauritius, Rose-Hill
College Sainte-Marie (Mauritius), Quatre Bornes

New Zealand
St Mary's College, Auckland, an all-girls Catholic school in Ponsonby
St Mary's College, Wellington, an all-girls Catholic school
St Mary's College, Christchurch, an all-girls Catholic school, now Marian College

Pakistan
St Mary's College, Rawalpindi

Philippines
St. Mary's College of Baliuag
St. Mary's College of Meycauayan
Saint Mary's College of Borongan
Saint Mary's College of Quezon City

Saint Lucia
Saint Mary's College (Saint Lucia), an all-boys Catholic Secondary School

Sri Lanka
St. Mary's College, Chilaw, Catholic Secondary School in Puttalam District
St. Mary's College, Kegalle, an all-boys Catholic Secondary School
St. Mary's College, Trincomalee, school in Trincomalee

Thailand
Saint Mary's College Nakhon Ratchasima, Catholic School

Trinidad and Tobago
Saint Mary's College, Trinidad and Tobago, a Catholic Secondary School in Port of Spain, Trinidad

United Kingdom

Secondary Education
St. Mary's College, Blackburn, a Roman Catholic sixth form college in Lancashire, England
St Mary's College, Clady, a Roman Catholic secondary school in Clady, County Londonderry, Northern Ireland
St Mary's College, Crosby, a co-educational, formerly Irish Christian Brothers, school in Great Crosby, England
St Mary's College, Derry, Northern Ireland
St Mary's College, Hull, a Roman Catholic secondary school in Hull, Yorkshire, England
St Mary's College, Middlesbrough, a Roman Catholic sixth form college in Middlesbrough, England which closed in 2011
St Mary's College, Wallasey, a Catholic comprehensive in the Wirral, England
St Mary's College, Southampton, now St Mary's Independent School, a Roman Catholic school in Southampton, England

Higher Education
St Mary's University College, Belfast, a college of Queen's University Belfast, in Northern Ireland
St Mary's College, Durham, a college of Durham University
St Mary's College, St Andrews, a college of the University of St Andrews, Scotland
St Mary's University College, Twickenham, England, now St Mary's University
St Mary's College, Oxford, a former college of Oxford University
St Mary's College of Education, a former teacher training college in Newcastle upon Tyne
Seminaries
St Mary's College, Oscott, England

United States
by state
Saint Mary's College of California
St. Mary's College (Delaware), Wilmington, Delaware
Saint Mary's College (Indiana), Notre Dame, Indiana
Saint Mary's Academy and College, St. Marys, Kansas
University of Saint Mary, formerly Saint Mary College, Leavenworth, Kansas
St. Mary's College (Kentucky), Lebanon, Kentucky
St. Mary's College (Baltimore) now known as St. Mary's Seminary and University.
St. Mary's College of Maryland, St. Mary's City, Maryland
St. Mary's College (Ilchester), Ilchester, Maryland
Saint Mary's College (Michigan), Orchard Lake, Michigan—now a college of Madonna University
St. Mary's College (Minnesota), now Saint Mary's University of Minnesota
College of Saint Mary, Omaha, Nebraska, an all-woman's college
St. Mary's College (North Carolina), now Saint Mary's School, Raleigh, North Carolina
St. Mary's College, later Marylhurst University, Marylhurst, Oregon (defunct)
St. Mary's College, now part of Wyalusing Academy, Prairie du Chien, Wisconsin
St. Mary's College, now the University of Dayton

See also
St Mary's College RFC, Dublin
St. Mary's School (disambiguation)
Saint Mary's University (disambiguation)
St. Mary's Academy (disambiguation)
Mount St. Mary's (disambiguation)